The Montreux Record is a register of wetland sites on the List of Ramsar wetlands of international importance where changes in ecological character have occurred, are occurring, or are likely to occur as a result of technological developments, pollution or other human interference. It is a voluntary mechanism to highlight specific wetlands of international importance that are facing immediate challenges.  It is maintained as part of the List of Ramsar wetlands of international importance.

Established in 1990

List of sites under the Montreux Record

As in August 2021, 48 sites are listed in the Montreux Record. The Montreux Record was established by Recommendation 4.8 at the COP-4 in 1990 held at Montreux, Switzerland. It was adopted by the Conference of Contracting parties in Brisbane in 1996.

References

Ramsar Convention